Dhoom Music  is an Indian Bengali-language music-oriented television channel launched in 2010. The channel broadcasts the songs of Bengali movies.

Programming
Jukebox
Muzik @ 9
Muzik @ 9:30
Muzik @ 10
Dhoom Live (3:30pm)
Muzik @ 17:30
Muzik @ 18:45
Muzik @ 20:30

References

Bengali-language television channels in India
Television channels and stations established in 2010
Television stations in Kolkata
Music television channels in India